Weyland or Weylandt may refer to:

In mythology 
 Weyland or Wayland the Smith, a legendary smith in Germanic and Norse mythology
 Völundarkviða, the Lay of Weyland, a Norse epic poem about the smith

People 
 Bernadette Weyland, German politician
 Thomas Weyland (1230–1298), British justice
 Jacob Weyland  (fl. 1705), Dutch explorer of the New Guinea coast who discovered Geelvink Bay
 Richard Weyland (1780–1864), British politician
 Joseph Weyland (1826–1894), German bishop
 Paul Weyland (1888–1972), German anti-Semitic conman and agitator who organized an anti-Einstein campaign
 Hermann Weyland (1888–1974), German botanist and chemist
 Otto P. Weyland (1903–1979), American Air Force General
 Marcel Weyland (born 1927), Polish-Australian translator
 Jack Weyland (born 1940), American physicist and author
 Joseph Weyland (born 1943), Luxembourgian diplomat
 Wouter Weylandt (1984–2011), Belgian cyclist who died in the Giro d'Italia

Fiction 
 In the Alien vs. Predator franchise:
 Charles Bishop Weyland, a fictional character from Alien vs. Predator (2004) and the original founder of Weyland Industries pre-2004 — see Bishop (Aliens)
 Weyland Corporation (Weyland Industries), a fictional technology corporation predecessor to Weyland-Yutani, founded by Peter Weyland in 2012 who was in turn introduced in the movie Prometheus (2012 film)
 Weyland-Yutani, a fictional megacorporation from the Alien franchise
 In the Death Race franchise:
 R. H. Weyland. a corporate businessman that gets the rights to Death Race taken over by a rich, young, business opportunist playboy, named Niles York
 Weyland Corporation (Weyland International), a fictional private corporation running the prison system on Terminal Island and hosting the Death Match, a televised pay-per-view competition where two dangerous convicts are chosen and then forced to fight to the death or submission.
 Weyland Smith from The Fables Vertigo Comics title
 John Wayland Smith, a fictional blacksmith from The Dark Is Rising Sequence fantasy series by Susan Cooper
 Weyland Consortium, a fictional megacorporation from Android: Netrunner
 Cadmann Weyland, a fictional character from the science fiction novels The Legacy of Heorot and Beowulf's Children co-authored by Larry Niven, Jerry Pournelle, and Steven Barnes.

Other 
Point Weyland, headland in South Australia
 The Weyland Mountains or Köbowrè Range in West Papua named after Jacob Weyland
 Weyland ringtail possum (Pseudochirulus caroli), a species of marsupial from Papua named after the mountains

See also
 Wayland (disambiguation)
 Weiland in Wiktionary
 Weiland (disambiguation)
 Wieland (disambiguation)
 Woland
 Wyland (disambiguation)